Shamil Uddin Ahmed Shimul is a Bangladesh Awami League politician and the incumbent Member of Parliament of Chapai Nawabganj-1.

Career
Ahmed was elected to parliament from Chapai Nawabganj-1 as a Bangladesh Awami League candidate 30 December 2018.

References

Awami League politicians
Living people
11th Jatiya Sangsad members
1969 births